Daniel K. Isaac is an American actor and writer. He is known for his recurring role as Ben Kim in Showtime's Billions. Isaac is also known for creating the hashtag #AccordingToMyMother, which he uses to share comedic conversations between him and his mother.

Early life and education 
Isaac's parents are immigrants from Korea. His mother raised him in California as a single parent, and he grew up bilingual. Isaac is an only child. He received his bachelor's degree in theater from the University of California, San Diego.

Career 
In 2015, Isaac created the hashtag #AccordingToMyMother to share comedic conversations with his mother. He then started a Kickstarter campaign to finance a short film loosely based on their relationship. Isaac produced and starred in what became a television pilot, According to My Mother, with Cathy Yan and Devin Landin. It premiered at the New York Television Festival in October 2016 and won the award for Best Drama. Isaac was named Best Actor in a Drama for his performance.

Isaac has appeared in the role of Ben Kim in Billions since its premiere in 2016. The role was initially written to be to a three-episode part, but the writers ended up making the character a series regular the first two seasons. Isaac also stars as a bike courier with a foot fetish in the BDSM-focused web series Mercy Mistress, produced by Margaret Cho.

He portrayed William Inge in an off-Broadway production of Philip Dawkins' The Gentleman Caller in May 2018.

Isaac appeared in a recurring role as Jeremy Delongpre in the first season of the 2019 Comedy Central series The Other Two. He also played the role of "Sandwich Artist" in the May 22, 2022 Episode (#251) of the HBO series Last Week Tonight with John Oliver.

In 2022, Isaac made his play-writing debut with Once Upon a (Korean) Time, which was produced by the Ma-Yi Theatre Company and performed at the historic La MaMa Experimental Theatre Club in New York City. The production was directed by Ralph Peña.

Personal life 
Isaac is gay. He voluntarily participated in gay conversion therapy from the age of 13 to 16. His mother, a devout Christian, disowned him for his sexuality when he was a freshman in college. Isaac later embraced his sexuality.

Credits

Film

Television

Theater

References

External links 

Year of birth missing (living people)
Living people
21st-century American male actors
American stage actors
American gay actors
American male actors of Korean descent
American male television actors
American LGBT people of Asian descent
University of California, San Diego alumni
Male actors from California
21st-century LGBT people